Tim Pollmann (born 5 January 1990) is a German footballer who plays as a central defender for FC Ingolstadt II.

Career 
Pollmann began his career with SV Saal an der Donau and later joined Jahn Regensburg. In Regensburg he played six years in the youth team and was promoted to first team in November 2008, making his debut on 8 November 2008 against VfB Stuttgart II.

He signed a 3-year contract with FC Ingolstadt 04 on 29 January 2009 and moved to Ingolstadt on 1 July 2009.

See also
Football in Germany
List of football clubs in Germany

References

External links
 

1990 births
Living people
German footballers
Association football defenders
SSV Jahn Regensburg players
FC Ingolstadt 04 players
3. Liga players
FC Ingolstadt 04 II players
People from Kelheim
Sportspeople from Lower Bavaria
Footballers from Bavaria